Lohagara is a town in Chittagong District in the division of Chittagong, Bangladesh. It is the administrative headquarters and urban centre of Lohagara Upazila.

References 

Lohagara Upazila, Chittagong
Populated places in Chittagong Division